Manchahi is a Pakistani drama television serial premiered on Geo Entertainment on 22 December 2016. The serial is directed by Nadeem Siddiqui, written by Kifayat Rodani, and produced by Babar Javed.

Plot 
Momina loses her parents in a car crash at a school-going age. Being the only child of her parents, she was pampered with every luxury. Momina’s life turns upside down when she learns that she doesn’t only have to survive on her own but she also has to take care of her newborn sister— whose birth had taken place on the day of the accident.

Momina and her sister are then adopted by their aunt Bushra, who lives a conservative life. The girl who once belonged to an upper social stratum now begins to live with lower income family. Various restrictions begin to suffocate Momina when Bushra’s son, Sakhawath, takes the responsibility to look after her. Days become tougher and the time comes when Bushra passes away— leaving a young Sakhawath to continue his studies, run a shop and look after two young cousins. Eventually Momina becomes a homemaker and discontinues her education.

Momina and her close school friend, Baqar, gradually develop feelings for each other. However, Baqar is not sure if he genuinely wants her in his life. Sakhawath, on the hand, has thought of marrying Momina when the time is right. Although Sakhawath has disliked Baqar since school days, he is unaware of the emotional connection between Baqar and Momina.

Baqar’s friends tease him that despite being Momina’s lover, the two stay at a distance. As if whatever that happened in Momina’s life wasn’t tragic enough, Baqar forces his intentions on her physically, which makes Momina pregnant.

Cast
Zarnish Khan as Momina
Faizan Khawaja as Sakhawat
Jahanzeb Khan as Baqar
Kinza Hashmi
Annie Zaidi as Nadia
Manzoor Qureshi
Sadaf Yasin
Arisha Razi
Adnan Shah Tipu
Dawar Nawaz
Mehboob Sultan
Yasra Rizvi
Agha Ali (Cameo)
Nausheen Shah (Cameo)
Hanzala Shahid as Sakhawat
Anas Yasin as Baqar

References

Geo TV original programming
A&B Entertainment
2016 Pakistani television series debuts